Paradusta is a genus of sea snails, marine gastropod mollusks in the family Cypraeidae, the cowries.

Species
 Paradusta barclayi (Reeve, 1857)
 Paradusta hungerfordi (G. B. Sowerby III, 1888)

References

 Lorenz, F. (2017). Cowries. A guide to the gastropod family Cypraeidae. Volume 1, Biology and systematics. Harxheim: ConchBooks. 644 pp.

External links
 

Cypraeidae